Bayala is a  former Village development committee in Achham District in the Seti Zone of western Nepal. At the time of the 2001 Nepal census, the population was 3464, of which 28% was literate. Bayala now forms part of the municipality of Kamalbazar which was established in 2014.

References

Populated places in Achham District
Village development committees in Achham District